Petr Fuksa Jr. (born 9 August 1998) is a Czech canoeist. He competed in the men's C-1 1000 metres and men's C-2 1000 metres events at 2020 Summer Olympics.

Career
Fuksa and his brother Martin first began competing together as C-2 canoeists in 2017 at the Canoe Sprint World Cup. Fuksa and his brother represented the Czech Republic at the 2019 European Games in the men's C-2 1000 metres event and finished in sixth place with a time of 3:46.072.

Fuksa represented the Czech Republic at the 2020 Summer Olympics in the men's C-2 1000 metres event with his brother Martin, and in the men's C-1 1000 metres event.

Personal life
Fuksa is the son of former canoeist Petr Fuksa and the brother of Martin Fuksa.

References

External links
 
 

1993 births
Living people
Czech male canoeists
Olympic canoeists of the Czech Republic
Canoeists at the 2019 European Games
Canoeists at the 2020 Summer Olympics
People from Nymburk
European Games competitors for the Czech Republic
Sportspeople from the Central Bohemian Region